John Hardy (September 19, 1835 – December 9, 1913) was an American lawyer and politician who served as a United States representative from New York, serving two terms from 1881 to 1885.

Biography 
Hardy was born in Scotland on September 19, 1835. He immigrated to the United States in 1839 with his parents, who settled in New York City. He attended the public schools and graduated from the College of the City of New York in 1853; studied law; was admitted to the bar in 1861 and commenced practice in New York City.

Political career 
He was member of the New York State Assembly (New York Co., 11th D.) in 1861. He was member of the board of aldermen of New York City in 1863, 1864, and from 1867 to 1869; clerk of the common council in 1870 and 1871; chief clerk in the office of the mayor in 1877 and 1878.

Congress 
He was elected as a Democrat to the 47th United States Congress to fill the vacancy caused by the death of Fernando Wood; reelected to the 48th United States Congress and served from December 5, 1881, until March 3, 1885; unsuccessful candidate for reelection in 1884.

Later career and death 
He resumed the practice of law in New York City and died there December 9, 1913; interment in Green-Wood Cemetery, Brooklyn, N.Y.

References

External links
 
 

1835 births
1913 deaths
Democratic Party members of the New York State Assembly
City College of New York alumni
Burials at Green-Wood Cemetery
Democratic Party members of the United States House of Representatives from New York (state)
Scottish emigrants to the United States
19th-century American politicians